Glenrath Heights is a hill in the Manor Hills range, part of the Southern Uplands of Scotland. It is the second highest hill in a route of hills known as the Dun Rig Horseshoe, south of Peebles.

References

Donald mountains
Mountains and hills of the Scottish Borders